Granger Cottage is a historic home located at Canandaigua in Ontario County, New York. It is a two-story, three-bay Gothic Revival style dwelling on a slightly raised cobblestone foundation.  It was built in the 1850s.  In 1907, the cottage was moved and a Colonial Revival style porch was added.

It was listed on the National Register of Historic Places in 1984.

Gallery

References

Houses on the National Register of Historic Places in New York (state)
Gothic Revival architecture in New York (state)
Colonial Revival architecture in New York (state)
Houses completed in 1850
Houses in Ontario County, New York
National Register of Historic Places in Ontario County, New York